Bamboo steamers, called zhēnglóng in Chinese, originated in Han Dynasty in Canton area．

The most famous kind of bamboo steamers are used in Chinese cuisine and date back to 5,000 years in Southern China. They are produced by removing the skin from the bamboo, soaking it in water, shaping it into a circle, and hammering it in with nails. The base is made up of woven bamboo strips, and production can take anywhere from 15 minutes to several hours depending on its size.

Bamboo steamers have become prominent to the Western world for its role in cooking and serving dim sum, particularly during the practice of yum cha. They are designed to be stacked on top of each other so that the steam can cook many different servings simultaneously, as well as fit on the table (often on a Lazy Susan) while being served.

In recent years, alternatives to the traditional bamboo material have been developed, including silicone.

History 
There is a saying about the origin of steamers in china, In the period of emperor Gaozu of the Han Dynasty, General Han Xin used bamboo and wood to make cooking utensils and steam to cook food, so as to avoid exposure of cooking smoke to the barracks. Cooking dry food is easier to preserve, which is the origin of bamboo steamer. In fact, archaeology has proved that people used bamboo to make various utensils as early as ancient times, and steaming was the earliest recorded cooking method in the Zhou Dynasty.

Ancient steamers are made of pottery and bronze. The ancient kitchen mural in the tomb of the Eastern Han Dynasty at Dahuting No.1 in Mi County, Henan Province, is the earliest evidence of the origin of modern steamers.

Gallery

References

See also 
 List of cooking vessels
 Siru

Chinese cooking techniques
Chinese food preparation utensils
Chinese inventions
Japanese bamboowork
Japanese food preparation utensils
Japanese inventions